Gerald McIntyre (22 May 1929 – 27 January 2008) was a long distance and cross country runner. He represented both Clonliffe Harriers and Ponders End AC, London.
He ran the marathon at the 1960 Summer Olympics in Rome, finishing 22nd with a time of 2:26:03.

He competed at both the 1960 International Cross Country and 1961 International Cross Country championships.

References

External links 
 Clonliffe Harriers AC Olympians
 
 "50 years ago in Rome"

1929 births
2008 deaths
Irish male long-distance runners
Irish male marathon runners
Olympic athletes of Ireland
Athletes (track and field) at the 1960 Summer Olympics
Sportspeople from Birmingham, West Midlands